Kiša pada, trava raste (The Rain Falls, the Grass Grows) is the third release and third gramophone record by Bosnian folk singer Beba Selimović. It was released in 1962 through the label Diskos.

Track listing

Personnel
Orkestar Radojke Živković – orchestra

References

1962 albums
Beba Selimović albums
Diskos (record label) albums